The 2021 West Lancashire Borough Council election took place on 6 May 2021 to elect members of  West Lancashire Borough Council in Lancashire, England.

This election was postponed from May 2020 due to the Covid Pandemic.

Results summary

Ward results

Ashurst

Aughton and Downholland

Birch Green

Burscough East

Burscough West

Derby

Digmoor

Halsall

Hesketh-with-Becconsall

Knowsley

Moorside

Rufford

Scott

Skelmersdale North

Skelmersdale South

Tarleton

Up Holland

Wrightington

By-elections

North Meols

References

2021 English local elections
2021
2020s in Lancashire